Salbah is a village in Jabal Nimr, Yemen. It is located in the Hajjah Governorate, According to the 2004 census it had a population of 945 people.

External links
Towns and villages in the Al Hudaydah Governorate
National Information Center in Yemen

References

Populated places in Hajjah Governorate
Port cities in the Arabian Peninsula
Port cities and towns of the Red Sea